Sviliai (formerly) is a village in Kėdainiai district municipality, in Kaunas County, in central Lithuania. According to the 2011 census, the village had a population of 134 people. The Pernarava-Šaravai Forest is next to Sviliai. 

An ancient burial place and prehistoric settlement site are located in Sviliai area.

History
The village has been known since 1575. There were 13 homesteads in 1820. There was a watermill at the beginning of the 20th century. Sviliai was a property of the Liudkevičiai at that time. During the Soviet era it was a kolkhoz subsidiary settlement.

Demography

References

Villages in Kaunas County
Kėdainiai District Municipality